The following is a list of royal guests at the coronation of Queen Elizabeth II, which took place on 2 June 1953.

Family of Queen Elizabeth II

British royal family
 The Duke of Edinburgh, the Queen's husband and consort
 The Duke of Cornwall, the Queen's son and heir
 Queen Elizabeth The Queen Mother, the Queen's mother
 Princess Margaret, the Queen's sister
 The Princess Royal, the Queen's paternal aunt
 The Earl and Countess of Harewood, the Queen's first cousin and his wife
 The Hon. Gerald Lascelles, the Queen's first cousin
 The Duke and Duchess of Gloucester, the Queen's paternal uncle and aunt
 Prince William of Gloucester, the Queen's first cousin
 Prince Richard of Gloucester, the Queen's first cousin
 The Duchess of Kent, the Queen's paternal aunt by marriage (and the Duke of Edinburgh's first cousin)
 The Duke of Kent, the Queen's first cousin
 Princess Alexandra of Kent, the Queen's first cousin
 Prince Michael of Kent, the Queen's first cousin
 Princess Marie Louise, the Queen's first cousin twice removed
 Lady Patricia and The Hon. Sir Alexander Ramsay, the Queen's first cousin twice removed and her husband
 Alexander Ramsay of Mar, the Queen's second cousin once removed
 The Earl of Athlone and Princess Alice, Countess of Athlone, the Queen's paternal great-uncle and great-aunt (also the Queen's first cousin twice removed)
 Lady May and Sir Henry Abel Smith, the Queen's first cousin once removed and her husband
 Richard Abel Smith, the Queen's second cousin

Bowes-Lyon family
 Albemarle Bowes-Lyon,  the Queen's first cousin
 The Hon. Mrs. Andrew Elphinstone, wife of the Queen's first cousin
 James Bowes-Lyon, the Queen's first cousin once removed

Teck-Cambridge family
 The Marquess and Marchioness of Cambridge, the Queen's first cousin once removed
 Lady Mary and Peter Whitley, the Queen's second cousin and her husband
 The Duchess and Duke of Beaufort, the Queen's first cousin once removed and her husband
 Lady Helena Gibbs, the Queen's first cousin once removed

The Duke of Edinburgh's family

Greek royal family
 Princess Andrew of Greece and Denmark, the Duke of Edinburgh's mother (and the Queen's second cousin once removed and mother-in-law)
 The Princess and Prince of Hohenlohe-Langenburg, the Duke of Edinburgh's sister and brother-in-law, (and the Queen's second cousins once removed)
 Princess Beatrix of Hohenlohe-Langenburg, the Duke of Edinburgh's niece (and the Queen's third cousin)
 The Margravine and Margrave of Baden, the Duke of Edinburgh's sister and brother-in-law, (and the Queen's second cousins once removed)
 The Hereditary Prince of Baden, the Duke of Edinburgh's nephew (and the Queen's third cousin)
 Princess and Prince George William of Hanover, the Duke of Edinburgh's sister and brother-in-law, (and the Queen's second cousins once removed)
 Princess Christina Margarethe of Hesse, the Duke of Edinburgh's niece (and the Queen's third cousin)
 Prince and Princess George of Greece and Denmark, the Duke of Edinburgh's paternal uncle and aunt (and the Queen's first cousin twice removed and his wife)  (representing the King of the Hellenes)

Mountbatten family
 The Marquess of Milford Haven, the Duke of Edinburgh's first cousin (and the Queen's third cousin)
 The Earl and Countess Mountbatten of Burma, the Duke of Edinburgh's maternal uncle and aunt (and the Queen's second cousin once removed and his wife)
 Lady Pamela Mountbatten, the Duke of Edinburgh's first cousin (and the Queen's third cousin)
 The Marchioness of Carisbrooke, wife of the Queen's first cousin twice removed (and wife of the Duke of Edinburgh's first cousin once removed)

Rulers of British protectorates
 Shaik Salman bin Hamad Al Khalifa I of Bahrain
 Shaik Abdullah III Al-Salim Al-Sabah of Kuwait
 Sultan Omar Ali Saifuddien III of Brunei
 Sultan Ibrahim IV of Kelantan
 Sultan Hisamuddin and Raja Jemaah of Selangor
 Sultan Ibrahim and the Sultanah of Johor
 Sultan Khalifa bin Harubn and the Sultanah Nunu of Zanzibar
 Sultan Ali III ibn 'Abd al-Karim al-'Abdali of Lahej
 Sultan Yusuf Izzuddin Shah of Perak
 Queen Salote of Tonga
 Sheikh Ahmad bin Ali Al Thani, representing the Emir of Qatar

Members of foreign royal families
 The Crown Prince and Crown Princess of Norway, the Duke of Edinburgh's second cousins and the Queen's first cousin once removed and his wife (also the Queen's second cousin once removed) (representing his father, the King of Norway)
 Princess Astrid of Norway, the Duke of Edinburgh's second cousin once removed and the Queen's second cousin
 Prince and Princess Axel of Denmark, the Queen's first cousin twice removed and second cousin once removed (also the Duke of Edinburgh's first cousin once removed and second cousin) (representing his first cousin once removed, the King of Denmark)
 The Duke of Halland, the Queen's second cousin once removed (representing his father, the King of Sweden)
 The Prince of Liège, the Queen's third cousin (representing his brother, the King of the Belgians)
 The Hereditary Grand Duke and Hereditary Grand Duchess of Luxembourg, the Queen's fourth cousin and third cousin (representing the Grand Duchess of Luxembourg)
 The Prince Consort of the Netherlands (representing his wife, the Queen of the Netherlands)
 The Crown Prince of Laos (representing the King of Laos)
 Prince Himalayapratrap Vir Vikram Shah and Princess Princep (representing the King of Nepal)
 The Hereditary Prince of Vietnam (representing Bảo Đại, the Chief of State of Vietnam)
 The Crown Prince of Japan (representing the Emperor of Japan)
 The Crown Prince of Ethiopia (representing the Emperor of Ethiopia)
 Prince Fahad Ibn Abdul Aziz (representing the King of Saudi Arabia)
 Shah Wali Khan (representing the King of Afghanistan)
 The Crown Prince of Iraq (representing the King of Iraq)
 Prince Sisowath Monireth (representing the King of Cambodia)
 Prince and Princess Chula Chakrabongse (representing the King of Thailand)
 Prince Saif Al Islam Al Hassan (representing the King of Yemen)
 The Nabil Suleyman Daoud (representing the King of Egypt)
 Prince Karl Alfred and Princess Agnes of Liechtenstein (representing the Prince of Liechtenstein)
 Prince Pierre of Monaco (representing the Prince of Monaco)

References

1953 in England
Royal guests
Royal guests at the coronation